Suning.com Co., Ltd., formerly Suning Commerce Group Co., Ltd. is one of the largest non-government retailers in China, headquartered in Nanjing, Jiangsu Province. Suning has more than 10,000 stores nationwide and its e-commerce platform, Suning.com ranks among top three Chinese B2C companies.  The operation categories include physical merchandise, such as home appliances, 3C products, books, general merchandise, household commodities, cosmetics and baby care products, content products and service merchandise with the total number of SKU exceeding 3 million. It was listed on the Shenzhen Stock Exchange in 2004. In 2021, Suning.com ranked at 328th on the Fortune Global 500 list.

Suning.com is ranked 9th on the list of the 15 Fastest Growing Ecommerce Companies in 2020 according to a report published by the international finance website "Insider Monkey", and ranked 2nd in "Total Online Retail Sales" in China.

Business areas
Suning Commerce Group Co., Ltd. principally operates franchised retail shops of electronics appliances in China. The Company mainly offers colour televisions (TVs), audio and video (AV) players, disc players, refrigerators, washing machines, digital and information technology (IT) products, small household electronics, air conditioners, telecommunications products and other products. The company also provides installation and repair services for electronic appliances. As of December 31, 2010, the company had 1,311 stores in 231 cities across China.
As of June 30, 2020, after the acquisition of the Carrefour supermarket network in China, Suning.Com owned 2,756 stores of various types:
Suning Plaza (shopping malls) - 37
3C specialty shop (household appliances) - 2.108
Suning.Com Stores - 197
Carrefour supermarket - 240
RedBaby brand stores (baby and maternity products) - 146
Shops in Hong Kong - 28
There were 5,660 Suning.Com franchise stores, for a total of 8682. In the first quarter of 2021, another 831 stores were opened in June bringing the total to over 9000 cloud retail stores. Suning.com is present in China (the mainland China and Hong Kong S.A.R.) and Japan, in the retail industry, with over 10,000 stores.

The company has been on the Fortune Global 500 list since 2017.

History 
On 26 December 1990, the predecessor of Suning was founded in Nanjing as an air-conditioner retail store. On 15 May 1996,  (literally Suning Domestic Appliance Co., Ltd.) was incorporated. In 2000 the company was renamed into  (literally Suning Domestic Appliance (Group) Co., Ltd.) and then Suning Appliance Chain Store (Group) Co., Ltd..

In July 2004, Suning Appliance Chain Store (Group) was listed on SZSE. As at 31 December 2004, founder and chairman Zhang Jindong owned 35.12% stake, followed by Jiangsu Suning Appliance Co., Ltd., which was the parent company of Suning Appliance Chain Store (Group) Co., Ltd., for 18.29% stake. Chen Jinfeng owned 8.78% stake. Moreover, Liu Xiaomeng, Zhang Jindong, Sun Weimin (CEO of Suning) and Chen Jinfeng owned 42%, 28%, 18% and 12% stake respectively in Jiangsu Suning Appliance, as at 2002.

Suning Appliance Chain Store (Group) was renamed into Suning Appliance Co., Ltd. in 2005.

In 2009 Suning Appliance purchased Hong Kong based retail chain Citicall (as Citicall Retail Management), which became Hongkong Suning Commerce Co., Ltd., for HK$35 million and not more than HK$180 million for fixed assets.

2011-, Suning's been gradually exploring "online and offline" multi-channel integration.

On 19 February 2013, Suning Appliance announced to change the company name to Suning Commerce Group Co., Ltd.

On November 19, 2013, the Suning US R&D Center and Silicon Valley Research Institute was inaugurated in the city Palo Alto in California. The president of Suning Holdings Group Zhang Jindong officially announced the launch of the world's first research institute. Suning has clearly released the One-Wing Internet Roadmap, facility search will advance Suning's online to offline (O2O) business model (business strategy that attracts potential customers from online channels to shop in physical stores ) and will strengthen its back office, which include big data, business intelligence, high performance computing, online banking to improve efficiency operating in the retail sector.

In October 2015 PPTV was sold to chairman Zhang Jindong via a subsidiary of Suning Culture Investment Management for US$398.4102 million, making a profit of RMB 1.355 billion. In 2015 financial year the comprehensive income of Suning Commerce Group in consolidated basis was just 1.01168 billion RMB.

In April 2016 Suning Commerce acquired 4.90% stake in Nubia Technology from chairman Zhang Jindong for 283.7 million RMB, proportional to Zhang's subscription in the capital increase of Nubia in December 2015.

On 3 June 2016 Suning Commerce Group issued about 1.86 billion new shares to Taobao (China) Software Co., Ltd., a subsidiary of Alibaba Group, for about 28 billion RMB. During the year the company sold some properties to Zhang, making extraordinary profit for the loss-making company.

In 2018, the listed company was renamed to Suning.com Co., Ltd.

In 2019, Suning.com acquired 80% stake of the Chinese division of Carrefour. Also in 2019, Suning.Com acquired 37 department stores from the Wanda Group for 2,7 billion RMB. Was ranked as the largest omnichannel retailer in China and as the most valuable retail brand in China by the World Brand Lab, with a total brand value of US$39,093 billion and operating income of over US$37 billion.
As reported by the US magazine Fortune in 2019, it has a turnover of US$37 billion, and can count on 130,455 employees. 
As of September 30, 2019, the number of registered members of Suning.com's retail platform reached 470 million users.

In February 2021, Shenzhen International and Shenzhen Kunpeng Equity Investment Management (both state-owned enterprises) invest in Suning.com at 6.92 yuan per share, for a total of approximately 14.8 billion yuan (US$2.28 billion), or 8% of the total stake. of their capital company (745 million shares) and 15% (1.397 billion shares), for a total of 23%.

In May 2021, Suning.com released its report for the first quarter of 2021. Suning.com achieved operating profit of 54.05 billion yuan (approximately over US$8 billion) and net profit attributable to shareholders of listed companies reached 456 million yuan (over US$70 million). The Retail Cloud continued to develop in the first quarter, with 584 new stores opened and the scale of sales increased by 69% year on year (the 247 stores opened in June must be added for a total of 831 new stores opened since the beginning of the year).

Two branches of the Jiangsu Province-based government agency that oversees major state-owned businesses agreed to set up a 20 billion yuan (US$3.1 billion) fund with Suning.com's parent company Suning Holdings Group. The fund would be used to invest in its best performing assets and assets, a move that should give the company more breathing room to deal with its heavy debt load.

In June 2021, Zhang Jindong's company will in fact receive 3.2 billion yuan (US$500.6 million) from a state fund as it struggles to recover from a liquidity crisis. Suning.com said 5.59% of his shares will be transferred to a fund consisting of four state-owned enterprises ultimately controlled by the Jiangsu provincial government. The shares are controlled by an affiliate of Zhang Jindong, president of Suning.com, who currently holds 19.7% of the total shares. The transfer price will be 6.12 yuan per share, 90% of Tuesday's closing price. According to the agreement, Zhang will have the obligation to buy back the shares for sale by April 1, 2022, paying a consideration of 3.182 billion yuan, plus interest (equal to about 3.85% on an annual basis).

In mid June 2021, a Beijing court froze 3 billion yuan worth of shares Zhang holds in the group's retail arm Suning.com Co. for three years. With most of Zhang Jindong shares pledged as collateral for loans, that could complicate his ability to raise cash and potentially derail a state-backed rescue. Concerns over Suning's cash flow initially surged to the fore in September, when Zhang waived his right to a 20 billion yuan payment from Evergrande Group.Suning.com has stopped trading in its shares, the stock has fallen by the daily limit of 10%.

In early July 2021, it is announced that the company has reached an agreement with a group of investors, both private and government officials, who intervened on behalf of Suning.com. The transaction in question, which sees its core in the new "New Retail Innovation Fund Phase II" fund worth 8.83 billion yuan (US$1.36 billion), led by the state asset management committee of Nanjing and the government of Jiangsu province, will take over 16.96% of the company. The fund includes brands such as Alibaba Group, Haier, Midea Group, TCL and Xiaomi as protagonists. With this intervention, the shares of Zhang Jindong will drop from 20.96% to 17.62%, Suning Holdings Group's stake from 3.98% to 2.73%, Suning Appliance Group from 10.68% to 1.39% and the Tibet Trust's stake fell from 3.07% to zero. After a period of suspension on the stock exchange, from June 16 to July 5, the company's shares are up by a maximum of 10% after the dealer announces the financial transaction.

On 12 July  2021, Suning.com announces that the company's board of directors will be reorganized and that the resigned founder and chairman Zhang Jindong will take up his new position as honorary chairman of the company's board of directors. The company said Ren Jun, a board member, will perform chairman duties temporarily. Zhang Jindong will continue as legal representative until when no replacement is found. For the same role there are a total of four candidates, Huang Mingduan, Xian Handi, Cao Qun and Zhang Kangyang.

Through an official note published on July 29, 2021, Suning.com announced the new composition of the company's board of directors. The new Chairman of the board is Huang Mingduan, former CEO of "Sun Art Retail Group", a supermarket chain owned by Alibaba Group, replacing Suning.com interim chairman Ren Jun. Alibaba is the company led by Jack Ma and which, as part of the "New New Retail Fund", bought shares in the subsidiary Suning in early July. Steven Zhang, president of Suning International, president of Inter, vice president of Suning Holdings Group and son of Suning's number one, Zhang Jindong, was also appointed to the board of directors, together with Huang Mingduan, Xian Handi and Cao Qun, as a non-independent director of the company's seventh board of directors. On July 30 released results for the first half of 2021.

Smart logistics 
"Suning.com" Logistics is one of the leading retail logistics companies in China, with a delivery network covering 351 cities, 2858 districts and counties in China, with over 100,000 truck drivers working for the company. It has 5 warehouses just for regular deliveries in eastern China. The automatic warehouse in Nanjing covers more than 200,000 square meters, also the total area of the warehouse facility covers 9.64 million square meters. The size of the facilities justifies the number one position in the Chinese retail sector. Along with the size, is added the intelligent technology used by Suning. Over the years E-commerce platforms have revolutionized the way consumers shop, e-commerce has people ordering a product from the comfort of their home and quickly with home delivery. To date, with the Suning APP, it can count on over 600 million registered users.

Suning has incorporated an intelligent system into its operations, their state-of-the-art logistics facility. The entire Nanjing Logistics Center is divided into various parts intended to perform a variety of services. The storage of goods in the center is also divided into various segments that separate the products according to type and size. Use Schaefer technologies in its own intelligent logistics center. the ASRS system developed by Schaefer automation system, a German brand of automation technology in the storage sector, expands to the automated archiving and retrieval system.

The intelligent logistics center is almost fully automated with less human intervention which makes the storage process and the retrieval process for delivery extremely easy, fast and reliable. The system monitoring room has a huge screen with around 20 people working to keep the whole process smoother and faster. In the hall it has feeds from multiple cctv cameras positioned throughout the store, as well as feeds from various ASRS systems and manual worker feeds for a holistic approach to the entire logistics. The workers separate the products after receiving them from suppliers, storing them in small, medium and large piles and pallets. The workers have to scan the RFID code and then it goes for the final packaging before it can be delivered to the customers. The point that needs to be highlighted is the speed of the process because so many steps are covered in speed. Suning has a delivery of the products, purchased by the user, within twelve hours from the time of the order.

Automated distribution 
During the COVID-19 pandemic in mainland China, logistics and distribution grew significantly under the catalysis of the "rule of self-isolation". According to large-scale consumption data in epidemic prevention published by Suning, the volume of orders in China for Suning Convenience Stores increased by 419.6% year on year, and the volume of "order online and collect in store "of the Food Market rose by more than 655%. In the epidemic, every residential property exercised a certain level of" block ", and the traditional" contactless distribution "cannot meet the current situation. The advantages of unmanned technology are significant, such that it can improve the efficiency of the transfer between logistics warehouses and consumers. As a result, unmanned logistics can accelerate its development even after the outbreak.

Automated Unmanned Logistics describes its operational process from when packages leave the warehouse without personnel, are quickly transported overland to the distribution center in a driverless truck, then in the last mile they are delivered to their destination by an automated truck or drone. In 2018, Suning had completed the actual verification of its "Xinglong One" driverless truck. Technically, "Xinglong-1" uses advanced artificial intelligence technology that assists radar, high-precision maps, cameras and sensors, and can accurately identify obstacles up to 300 meters away in high-speed scenarios. In addition, it can also control the vehicle for emergency stops or bypass obstacles with a response speed of 25ms, and the highest speed of safe automatic driving can reach 80 km per hour. During the outbreak, Suning Logistics launched the "contactless distribution service" with 5G driverless vehicles. In collaboration with "Suning Convenience Store", "Suning Logistics" quickly set up an unmanned delivery team that guarantees instant delivery service within 3 km radius, further reducing the risk of infection between consumer and courier, further reducing the risk of infection between consumer and courier, effectively implementing the "self-isolation rule".

In 2018, Suning used autonomous delivery robots, which transport daily essentials such as drinks, fruit and snacks from the local store to the residents.

The new unmanned delivery robot called "BIU" can autonomously plan the route and avoid obstacles, deliver to the customer and return to service. The cooperation mode of "courier delivery + robot delivery to the community" opens the last 100 meters of distribution to the community during the outbreak, ensuring the safety and health of users and a high quality home service experience.

Mobility and transport 
The Suning.com company, in addition to the retail sector of household appliances and electronic products, is active in the automotive sector, luxury boats and aircraft of many categories, from business jets to civil helicopters.

Automotive 
The Suning.com Auto Company (Suning Auto) division opened 20 auto supermarkets in 2018 and in the following years will increase the number of auto shows in various cities, such as Xi'an, Chongqing, Chengdu and Tianjin. In addition to Chinese domestic brands, there are foreign brands in the stores, including BMW, Audi and Maserati. It also provides accessories, financial services and used cars.

Electric mobility 
In 2017, Suning invested US$200 million in favor of Chinese carmaker Byton, which produces electric vehicles, which unveiled its first concept car at the Consumer Electronics Show in Las Vegas in January 2018. In August 2020, Suning entered into an agreement with the Chinese giant Nio, a Chinese car manufacturer active since 2014 based in Shanghai, specialized in the design and development of electric vehicles and which, with its own team, also participates in the world championship of Formula E. They have established a long-term partnership to strengthen strategic cooperation in various fields, including channel expansion, product sales, brand promotion, B2B cooperation, technology products and development, and create development opportunities.
In the "Suning Plaza Auto", in accordance with the Baojun brand, the Baojun E100 is for sale is a two-seater electric microcar, with two doors and a hatch in the rear, and a design similar to a Smart electric drive and is the first vehicle in Baojun's electric microcar series, then there is the E200 and E300 version.

Car sharing 
Suning, in a joint venture with Alibaba Group and Tencent together with automobile manufacturers Changan Automobile, Dongfeng Motor Corporation and FAW Group collaborate for a service in the ride-sharing sector, with an investment of US$1.5 billion.

Sponsorship
In 2014 Suning.com sponsored the Spanish club FC Barcelona.  In January 2016, one of the shareholders of Suning Commerce, Suning Appliance Group, completed the purchase of the Chinese football club Jiangsu F.C. The Chinese name of the football club was then renamed as  literally Jiangsu Suning.com team. According to Suning Commerce, the company sponsored the football club  in 2016.

On 6 June 2016 chairman Zhang Jindong, via his own private holding company Suning Holdings Group, signed a contract to purchase the majority stake in Italian football club Inter Milan. The deal was approved by the extraordinary general meeting on 28 June 2016, which after the deal, Suning Holdings Group owned 68.55% shares. Suning.com, the online shopping website of Suning Commerce, became a sponsor of the Italian club.

On 28 December 2016 the League of Legends e-sports team T.Bear Gaming, at the time competing in the LSPL (China's secondary league), was acquired by Suning.com and re-branded as Suning Gaming. Following the re-branding, the team qualified for the League of Legends Pro League by winning the 2017 LSPL spring finals.

Acquisitions and partnerships

Shareholders
After the deal in July 2021, Suning's honorary chair, Zhang Jindong, Suning Holdings Group and Suning Appliance Group will hold a 21.74% in Suning.com, while Alibaba's Taobao will remain the retailer's second-largest shareholder with a 19.99 percent stake. The Suning-Taobao alliance was announced in 2015. The consortium will become the third largest shareholder with a 16.96-percent stake.

Board of directors
Board of Directors in charge as of 2021:

 Xiao Ling Wang - Chairman-Supervisory board
 Mingduan Huang - Chairman
 Jun Ren - President & Director
 Jian Ying Li - Member-Supervisory board
 Zhi Song Hua - Member-Supervisory board
 Xian Ming Fang - Independent director
 Shi Ping Liu - Independent director
 Qun Cao - Non-independent director
 Kangyang Zhang - Director
 Handi Xian - Director

Financial data

Gallery

See also 
 Taobao (China) Software, second largest shareholder of Suning.com Co., Ltd.
 Suning Holdings Group, sister company, minority shareholder of Suning.com Co., Ltd.
 Suning Appliance Group, minority shareholder of Suning.com Co., Ltd.

References

Further reading
 Li, Woke. " Suning plans massive expansion." China Daily. March 6, 2012.
 "Suning sets up R&D shop in California." China Daily. January 2, 2014.
 Li, Woke. "Yum to open restaurants in Suning stores." China Daily. May 10, 2012.
 He, Wei. "Suning eyes new telecom market." China Daily. October 22, 2013.
 "Suning enters finance." China Radio International at China Daily. December 19, 2014.

External links
 

Whitegoods retailers of China
Companies based in Nanjing
Consumer electronics retailers of China
Retail companies established in 1996
Chinese brands
Companies in the CSI 100 Index
Companies listed on the Shenzhen Stock Exchange
Civilian-run enterprises of China